Bajo Martín is a comarca in Aragon. It is part of the historical region of Lower Aragon. It is located in Teruel Province, in the transitional area between the Iberian System and the Ebro Valley.

It borders the Aragonese comarcas of Ribera Baja del Ebro, Campo de Belchite, Cuencas Mineras, Andorra-Sierra de Arcos, Bajo Aragón and Bajo Aragón-Caspe.

The Bajo Martín is named after the Martín River, a right-side tributary of the Ebro that flows across the comarca.

Neglect
This comarca was formerly connected with Tortosa by means of a railway line from La Puebla de Híjar. Known as "Ferrocarril del Val de Zafán", the line stretched to Alcañiz and Tortosa. Eventually it was planned that it would reach the sea at Sant Carles de la Ràpita. 

Construction work on the railway line began in 1891, but the last stretch between Tortosa and Sant Carles de la Ràpita was never completed before the line was abandoned and the rails dismantled in the last quarter of the 20th century.

Municipalities
 Albalate del Arzobispo
 Azaila
 Castelnou
 Híjar
 Jatiel
 La Puebla de Híjar
 Samper de Calanda
 Urrea de Gaén
 Vinaceite

References

External links

 ADIBAMA: Asociación para el Desarrollo Integral del Bajo Martín
 Centro de Estudios del Bajo Martín
 Bajo Martín Natural

Comarcas of Aragon
Geography of the Province of Teruel